EPIC 204376071 is an M-type star in the constellation of Scorpius. It is likely a member of the Upper Sco association, and is young enough that it has not yet become a main-sequence star.

Unusual light fluctuations of the star, including up to an 80% dimming in brightness (i.e., "single 80% deep occultation of 1-day duration"), were observed by astronomers. The unusual dimming was not only extremely deep, but also substantially asymmetric, with an egress about twice as long as the ingress. Nonetheless, such an unusual dimming for EPIC 204376071 is much greater than the 22% dimming observed for Tabby's star. Several explanations have been presented to explain the unusual dimming of the EPIC 204376071 star: one, orbiting dust or small particles; or two, a "transient accretion event of dusty material near the corotation radius of the star". The unusual lightcurve of the star is similar to the lightcurve of a candidate exoplanet, KIC 10403228 b, which may have been caused by a "tilted ring system" orbiting the planet. In the case of EPIC 204376071, an orbiting brown dwarf or large planet, with a ring system, could cause a similar lightcurve, according to the researchers.

See also
 Disrupted planet
 List of stars that have unusual dimming periods

References

External links

 EPIC Catalog at MAST
 , up to 80% dimming.

xx
2019 in science
Scorpius–Centaurus association
Unsolved problems in astronomy
Scorpius (constellation)